Lukáš Konečný (born 19 July 1978) is a Czech former professional boxer. He held the WBO interim, European and European Union light-middleweight titles, and challenged for a middleweight world title in his final fight. Konečný is widely considered to be the most successful boxer from the Czech Republic.

Amateur career 
He fought his first match when he was 14 years old, following this with numerous wins in several foreign tournaments and the Ústí nad Labem Grand Prix.  He took part in the Czech Republic Championship four times as a junior and five times as a senior. He was second in the European Juniors Championship in Sifoku in 1995 but one year later he lost in Havana where he came sixth. He won the bronze medal in the World Championship in Budapest in 1997 and repeated the feat in Texas in 1999.  He achieved second place in the Córdoba Cardin tournament in Cuba and the Olympic Games in Sydney (in 2000) crowned his amateur career. However he lost his first bout there.

Amateur Highlights
 2000 Summer Olympics, Light Welterweight, lost to Mohamed Allalou (Algeria) 9-17 in first round
 World Amateur Boxing Championships, Light Welterweight, 2 bronze medals (1997, 1999)
 European Junior Championship, Light Welterweight, silver medal (1996)
 5 Times Amateur Champion Of Czech Republic
 Córdoba Cardin Tournament, Light Welterweight, silver medal (2000)
 Amateur record 230-25-2

Professional career 
He signed a contract with German stable "SES" (Sport Events Steinforth) on May 1, 2001, drilling in Magdeburg but spending much time at home in Ústí nad Labem. Nowadays he works under the German manager Ulf Steinforth. During his career, Konečný won multiple belts, winning his first title in 2002 against Artur Drinaj for the German International light middleweight title. He defended this title several times, until its vacation. In 2004 and 2006 he got two title shots for the EBU-EU (European Union) light middleweight title, but in these fights he suffered two of his three career losses, but managed to win the vacant WBO Inter-Continental light middleweight title against Anderson Clayton in Prague. In 2006 he added the IBF Inter-Continental light middleweight title after victory against Ante Bilic, but Konečný then vacated the title. Lukáš managed to retain his WBO belt twice.

First world title shot 
In 2008 the biggest match of his career up to then came with Konečný facing Sergiy Dzinziruk for the WBO light middleweight title. He eventually lost on a majority decision after 12 rounds.

In 2009 he won the Czech middleweight championship.

In 2010 Konečný faced Matthew Hall for the EBU-EU (European Union) light middleweight title again. He prevailed after a TKO in round 6. In 2011 in Prague he defeated Hussein Bayram to become WBO Inter-Continental light middleweight champion for the second time in his career. It was his 11th straight victory and he became one of the top prospects in light middleweight.

Interim champion 
He then finally got his another major title shot with fight scheduled on 30 September. However his opponent Sergiy Dzinziruk cancelled the match according to his alleged injury. A lot of people started to speculate that Dzindiruk was trying to avoid his opponent. Dzindiruk was later stripped of the WBO Light Middleweight belt, which was subsequently won by Zaurbek Baysangurov. After long discussions it was revealed that he would fight Baysangurov on 10 March for the IBO and WBO Light Middleweight Championship. Unfortunately, Baysangurov had to cancel the fight because of his injury. This was already the second title match for Konečný, which was then cancelled. On 9 March, Konečný's stable SES introduced his next opponent. In this match he defeated French boxer Salim Larbi and became the interim WBO Light Middleweight champion.

Konečný vs. Baysangurov 
Konečný finally clashed with Zaurbek Baysangurov in a match in October 2012. Unfortunately for him, Baysangurov successfully retained his title belt after 12 rounds of boxing via a unanimous decision. The final judges’ scores were 119-109, 117-111 and 118-110, all for Baysangurov. Baysangurov used a high work rate to pound out the decision over the heavy-handed Konecny. In the last found, Konecny was cut over his left eye, but it hardly mattered because he was hopelessly behind by that point in the fight and was just looking for a knockout.

Shortly after this fight Konečný was thinking about retirement, but ultimately returned in a match against Karim Achour. This match was scheduled for vacant WBO European middleweight title and saw Konečný′s debut in middleweight division. Konečný prevailed over his opponent via unanimous decision.

Konečný vs. Quillin 
After the successful title defense, Konečný moved up to second position in the WBO middleweight rankings. In the March 2014 it was revealed via the web site boxrec.com, that Konečný will face WBO middleweight champion Peter Quillin on March 19 in Washington, D.C. for the world title. Prior to the fight Konečný announced that he will retire after the fight regardless of the result.

The fight was placed on the undercard of Bernard Hopkins vs. Beibut Shumenov; it was Konečný's debut on American soil, having fought previously only in Europe. Although being very much the underdog, Konečný stayed the distance of 12 rounds. Despite the fact that he lost via unanimous decision (119-109, 119-109, 120-108), he proved to be a tough opponent gaining positive reactions from some critics.

Personal life 
Lukáš Konečný currently lives in Ústí nad Labem with his wife Jarka and three daughters.

He is son of Milan Konečný, the first Czech professional boxer.

Professional boxing record

References

External links

 

|- 

|-

1978 births
Living people
Sportspeople from Brno
Czech male boxers
Boxers at the 2000 Summer Olympics
Olympic boxers of the Czech Republic
AIBA World Boxing Championships medalists
Light-middleweight boxers
Middleweight boxers
European Boxing Union champions